Are You Afraid of the Dark? is a horror anthology television series. The original series aired on Nickelodeon from 1992 to 1996; the pilot episode aired respectively on YTV and Nickelodeon in 1990 and 1991. It led to two revival series, with the first airing from 1999 to 2000, and the second debuting in 2019.

The original series was distributed worldwide by D. J. MacHale and Ned Kandel and was picked up by Nickelodeon in 1991. MacHale, Kandel, and Nickelodeon teamed up with the Canadian company Cinar, and as a part of the deal the show was filmed in Richmond, British Columbia, and in the Greater Montreal area of Quebec. The production teams were respectively represented by the ACTRA and SCTVQ (Syndicat des techniciens du cinéma et de la vidéo du Québec) labour unions. It premiered with the episode "The Tale of the Twisted Claw" as a pilot on October 31, 1990, on the Canadian television network YTV. The pilot aired on Nickelodeon on October 25, 1991, as a Halloween special. The series premiered the following year on Nickelodeon's SNICK on August 15, 1992, and on Family Channel on September 2, 1992. The series moved from Family Channel to YTV on September 6, 1993. The original series ended on April 20, 1996.

The first revival series, with new directors, writers, and a cast, was produced by Nickelodeon from 1999 to 2000 and also aired on the SNICK block. The sole member from the original lineup to return for the first and second seasons of the revival was Tucker (Daniel DeSanto), although Gary (Ross Hull) returned for the concluding show, which notably broke from the show's established format by blurring the line between story and "reality".

On November 13, 2017, it was announced that Paramount Players would make a live-action feature film adaptation. However, the film was later removed from Paramount's schedule. On February 14, 2019, it was announced that the series would be revived again for a limited series, which premiered on October 11, 2019. On February 19, 2020, this revival was renewed for a second season, titled Are You Afraid of the Dark?: Curse of the Shadows, which premiered on February 12, 2021, featuring a different cast. In March 2022, the revival was renewed for a third season, which premiered on July 30, 2022.

Background
Are You Afraid of the Dark? was filmed in Montreal by CINAR and created by producer D. J. MacHale, an American television producer. The show is a co-production between Montreal-based CINAR Films and the U.S. Nickelodeon network. It had its American debut on Nickelodeon in the United States during August, while Canada's Family Channel had the series premiere in September 1992. By 1993, the series had moved from Family Channel to YTV.

Both series of Are You Afraid of the Dark? revolved around a group of teenagers who referred to themselves as "The Midnight Society". Every episode, at a secret location in the woods at night, one member would tell a scary story to the group. The actual story, rather than the telling, was displayed to the television viewer. The story was shown between the group's arrival at the site and their departure.

Each storyteller would begin their story by saying "Submitted for the approval of The Midnight Society, I call this story '(story name)'", at which point they would toss a handful of "midnight dust" (actually Coffee-Mate) from a leather pouch into a campfire to heighten the flames and produce an eerie white smoke.

MacHale wrote the line "submitted for the approval of" as a nod to The Twilight Zone, in which creator Rod Serling would, after introducing the episode, say "submitted for your approval." The storyteller would continue by announcing its title (The Tale of...). The themes of the stories usually revolve around a variety of paranormal phenomena, such as demons, ghosts, magic, haunted houses, magical curses, aliens, witches, vampires, werewolves, and the like coming into contact with average youths. Usually, the episodes were either filmed in the woods, in abandoned houses, or in public places like schools or libraries. Sources of these tales vary in different ways; many were adaptations of public domain fairy tales and short stories or urban legends. For example, the episode "The Tale of the Twisted Claw" is an adaptation of W. W. Jacobs' short story, The Monkey's Paw.

Sometimes, the stories were inspired by a certain event in the life of the storyteller. In the episode "The Tale of the Crimson Clown," for instance, Tucker blackmailed his brother Gary with a poem he had found, which Gary had written for Samantha. Gary then told a story in which a naughty younger brother was punished cruelly for his evil deeds. At the end of the episode, Tucker gave the poem back to his brother. The majority of the horror stories on Are You Afraid of the Dark? had happy endings (or at least endings in which their characters were in decent places), but some of them (albeit a very small number of them) had either bad endings or twist endings like "The Tale of the Lonely Ghost," "The Tale of the Dark Music," "The Tale of the Chameleons," "The Tale of Vampire Town," and "The Tale of the Pinball Wizard."

At the end of most episodes, one character (usually Gary in the first run and Tucker in the second run of the show) would throw a red bucket of water onto the fire, stating, "I declare this meeting of The Midnight Society closed", and the group would leave the campsite, thus ending the storytelling. Sometimes, the story would be related to an event (e.g. in "The Tale of Laughing in the Dark," Kristen, who was afraid of clowns, ran off when Eric put on a clown mask. Then, everyone chased after her). This would cause either Gary or Tucker to hurriedly dump the water on the fire, and The Midnight Society would run off to wherever they go after meetings.

Episodes

Characters and cast

Each member of The Midnight Society from 1991 to 1996 has a distinct personality, and a notable trend in their storytelling. Though not all of their stories have similar styles and plots, in many of the stories, each character carries a unique aspect that reflects the nature of the storyteller, and what they find to be the most important to themselves. In the second generation, the characters derive their stories more from events that happen during the days leading up to the society meetings instead of from their personal interests and views. Many of the later episodes were simply given to a random society member to tell.

Original 
 Gary: An unassuming, bookish-looking boy and the founder of this generation of The Midnight Society. Gary has a distinct fascination with magic, especially where the magician Houdini is concerned. His stories tend to revolve around cursed or enchanted objects with supernatural properties, and how – in the wrong hands – they can cause disaster, for both the holder and those around them. His stories have the recurring character "Sardo" in them; most of his stories have the main character buying an enchanted item from Sardo's shop. In the 3-part episode, "The Tale of the Silver Sight", Gary reveals that his grandfather was the founder of The Midnight Society and that it was his grandfather's stories that inspired him to recreate the group.
 Betty Ann: A vibrant girl who has an open and eager passion for the bizarre and twisted. Her stories often include themes where an alien or supernatural force is either trying to break into the world of the characters, or else trying to drag them into their own unnatural realms. Her stories tend to have twists reminiscent of Twilight Zone episodes, hinting that the protagonists of her stories have not yet escaped danger by the end.
 Kiki: A spunky, tomboyish girl who often makes fun of others. Many of her stories involve plots where the danger of carelessness or deceitfulness, as well as the danger of the past, repeats itself. Also notable is that a large number of the characters in her stories are also of African descent (likely due to Kiki herself being African-Canadian), though the trend dies off later on in the series. One story she came up with had to be read by Gary due to her suffering from laryngitis at the time.
 Frank: A punkish teenager with an in-your-face attitude. Though his stories do not often have a running theme, they do often have the recurring character Dr. Vink appear as the villain, or at least, the creator of the story's antagonist. The first episode of the series has Frank attempting to impress the Midnight Society with a story to be allowed membership, which he does with "The Tale of the Phantom Cab". In season five, he and his family moved away, and he was replaced in the group by Stig.
 Tucker: Gary's younger brother and the youngest member of The Midnight Society. Due to his age, he is often portrayed as youthfully obnoxious. His stories tend to involve family relationships that are at first sour but grow in strength in the face of adversity, possibly reflecting his relationship with his brother Gary. There is also a running theme of the characters accidentally unleashing evil upon their world. After Gary left, he took over his place as the president of The Midnight Society. Once Tucker is in charge, he is less of a brat and more of a serious leader like his older brother. He is the only character to appear in both generations of The Midnight Society.
 Sam: A shy girl with an obvious mutual crush on Gary, which becomes one of the highlighted arcs of both their developments in the series. Reflecting this affection for Gary, Sam's stories tend to have more of a strong theme of love, and its endurance even beyond death.
 Kristen: A girl who, though squeamish about much else, has a fondness for ghost stories and fairy tales. She has a growing crush on David, and their affection for each other is a developing arc in the first few seasons. She loves to dress up for her stories or bring something for effect, sometimes to scare the others with and her stories almost always deal with ghosts from the past who have unfinished business that they cannot complete without the aid of the living. In season 3, she left The Midnight Society due to her and her family moving, and she was replaced in the group by Sam.
 David: A quiet boy with a mysterious expression. Reflecting his introverted nature and need to deal with his crush on Kristen, David's stories tend to be less about malignant outside forces, and more to do with the evil of past events left unresolved, or the darkness inside normal people, and the consequences of not dealing with their actions. In season 3, he and his family moved away, and he was replaced in the group by Tucker.
 Stig: His nickname may come from the term stigma, as he is marked an outsider for his notable lack of hygiene. Stig is the last member to be initiated into this generation of The Midnight Society. As such, he has only two stories in the series before the cast is changed: "The Tale of the Dead Man's Float" and "The Tale of Station 109.1." Due to the aversion people seem to have against him for his looks, both of his stories seem to revolve around outsiders judged for their appearances and/or tastes.
 Eric: Eric is portrayed as a diminutive teenager with visible Irish ancestry that influences his first story. As he has only had two stories in the first season before his character was cut, there is no visible theme in his storytelling but they seem to be about incredibly powerful evil forces (ones never proven innocent or misunderstood like some others). In his short run on the show, Eric was shown to be rather snide and negative, spending most of the time making sarcastic remarks and antagonizing the other members, especially Frank. He is the only character to leave the show without any explanation for his departure.

First revival
Several years after the last meeting of The Midnight Society, Tucker returns to reinitialize the meetings, inviting his own circle of friends to reform The Midnight Society.
 Quinn: Quinn is usually getting in trouble at school and at home, but he is a smart kid that likes to make fun of Andy teamed up with Vange. Quinn's stories have little in common though usually involve the protagonists' actions unleashing or bringing them face-to-face with the villain.
 Vange: Vange (short for "Evangeline") is the youngest of the New Midnight Society. She is a tomboy and does not have a problem with speaking her mind. Teamed up with Quinn she makes fun of Andy a lot. Vange's stories have little in common though most seem to be about how wanting something too badly can cause the main character to play into the villain's hands.
 Andy: Andy is very sweet and kind. He is always being made fun of by Quinn and Vange for having more muscle than brains. He lives on a farm with his family. He often works there before and after school. Andy is the closest to Megan. Andy's stories have little in common but are often about how characters' dark sides can unleash evil. Usually, the inspiration for his stories are based on his own real-life personal experiences.
 Megan: Megan is a rich kid who is not very comfortable in the woods. She would rather hold the New Midnight Society Meetings in her own well-managed backyard. Tucker, not being the stickler his brother was, lets Megan refurnish the campfire with some comfortable old couches. She seems to have a soft spot for Andy. Megan's stories have little in common though most seem to somehow involve romance. Sometimes she brings a prop or starts a brief game relating to her story.

Second revival
In 2019, a second revival of the show began. The first season is known as "Carnival of Doom", the second season is known as "Curse of the Shadows" and the third season is known as "Ghost Island".

Carnival of Doom
The Midnight Society:
 Rachel Carpenter: A shy girl who recently moved to the town of Argento. She quickly resigns herself to life as a social outsider, but when some classmates notice her interest in the horror genre, she earns an invite to the mysterious Midnight Society. She suffers from recurring nightmares and uses that to form her first story to submit to the group, The Carnival of Doom. She's named after John Carpenter.
 Akiko Yamato: A blunt and pragmatic member of the Midnight Society who enjoys filmmaking and is seen directing her own scary movie throughout the series. Her older brother, Hideo, is a rookie police officer.
 Gavin Coscarelli: An outgoing member who lives next door to Rachel and quickly takes an interest in her. He's good friends with Louise and is shown to be fairly popular at school. He's also a vegetarian. He's named after Don Coscarelli.
 Graham Raimi: A horror film fanatic who loves gushing about his favorite movies, although he often comes off awkward to his peers. He is also a talented artist and a germaphobe. He sits behind Rachel in class and is the first to pick up on Rachel's horror obsession, eventually inviting her to the group. He's named after Sam Raimi.
 Louise Fulci: A cheerleader and one of the popular girls at school who holds her reputation dearly. Although she's friends with Gavin, she avoids speaking to the other members of the Midnight Society outside of meetings, particularly Graham, in fear that it will affect her social status. She's named after Lucio Fulci.

Curse of the Shadows
The Midnight Society:
 Luke McCoy
 Hanna Romero
 Gabby Lewis
 Jai Malya
 Seth Romero
 Connor Stevens

Ghost Island
The Midnight Society:
 Kayla
 Max
 Leo
 Summer
 Ferris

Recurring characters
One of the more significant recurring characters was Sardo (Richard Dumont), owner of "Sardo's Magic Mansion" (a magic shop). He would often attempt to sell a character a "prized" item, succeeding almost every single time. He often had items in his shop that contained real properties of magic, yet did not know until it was revealed in the story. One of the most memorable recurring jokes in the series occurred when someone would address him as "Mr. Sardo." He would then get irritated and exclaim: "That's SarDO (Sardôh)! No mister; accent on the doh!"

Another recurring gag is Sardo attempting to sell a series of cheap novelty items before revealing the magical artifact, culminating with fake vomit, asking the protagonists, "Have you seen our vomit?" Additionally, when selling someone an item, he would often ask a rather high price. The main character would mention how much money they had, and Sardo would grab the money saying, "But I'm losing on the deal." Although he rarely got what he wanted, he would often end up helping the characters, often unintentionally. He appeared in Gary's stories, although in the later seasons, he appeared in two of Tucker's and one of David's in the episode "The Tale of The Dark Dragon."

Sardo's character is revived in the second season of the second revival, "Curse of the Shadows." Sardo's son (Ryan Beil) is the owner of "Sardo's Magic Shop". Richard Dumont appears in the finale as Sardo.

Another recurring character was Dr. Vink (Aron Tager). He was a physically imposing man who would often appear as a mad scientist, sorcerer, and the like. When he enters, he introduces himself by saying, "Vink's the name. Dr. Vink." He would also get his name mispronounced, usually something like "Dr. Fink?" When this happened, he would respond "Vink. With a va-va-va!" Often, the protagonist would call him a "nutbag" behind his back, assuming he could not hear him, only to have him reply later, "...and I am not a nutbag".

Unlike Sardo, whose character was set in a magic shop, Dr. Vink had many 'unique endeavors' as he called them, for his stories. These ranged from living deep in the woods conducting strange nature experiments, being a retired filmmaker, owning his own restaurant as head chef and lastly a barbershop. His activities were usually villainous, designed to put the characters in peril and allow him the last laugh. However, in his last appearance, "The Tale of Cutter's Treasure" (which was told by both Frank and Gary), he allied himself with Sardo and the main characters without his usual maliciousness. He appeared in Frank's stories. Aron Tager also played the carnival worker who stands in front of the Funhouse and invites people to go inside in the episode "The Tale of the Laughing in the Dark".

The character of Zeebo the Clown, also played by Tager, who appeared in "The Tale of the Laughing in the Dark" is referenced in several other stories, for example, in the episode "The Tale of the Whispering Walls", two children mention seeing him at a fun park, in the episode "The Tale of the Mystical Mirror", a girl says she will look like Zeebo if she wears too much lipstick, and in the episode "The Tale of the Crimson Clown" in the boys' room a video game called Zeebo's Big House can be seen on the desk with a picture of Zeebo on it as the title character. The video game was also mentioned in the episode "The Tale of Train Magic." Finally, in the episode "The Tale of the Night Shift," the teenage janitor is called Zeebo by his supervisor a few times at the beginning of the episode.

The villain, the "Ghastly Grinner" (star of "The Tale of the Ghastly Grinner"), like Zeebo the Clown, appears in a comic book that "Dark" characters read. In "Tale of the Ghastly Grinner", The Grinner is shown as being the star of a comic book.

Legacy 
The show became a weekly staple for children and tweens in the 1990s. Kids “were old enough to stay up but not old enough to stay out, so [they] spent nearly every Saturday night huddled around television sets with friends or siblings, pretending not to be terrified by that week’s tale.” As written by Matt Melis,“But there’s also a lot to admire in the care that went into trying to frighten us. We saw the protagonists encountering the creepy and supernatural in the same suburban settings we hailed from. They were remarkably vulnerable and insecure kids, too, ones with problems we could relate to; they were new kids, outcasts, rival siblings, and children experiencing rough patches like deaths in the family or parents filing for divorce.”Said series co-creator D.J. MacHale, “I wanted stories about real kids who were facing challenges that had nothing to do with the supernatural situation they ended up in.” He added, “But I'd like to believe that by depicting kids taking charge of difficult situations, it opened up kid-viewers to the idea that they aren't powerless in their own lives.” The show has also been hailed for its diversity in characters and stories. “I write about kids who find themselves in challenging situations, and ultimately solve the problems themselves ... no matter their sex, race, or age. We wanted to depict a wide variety of stories, characters, and situations. It was all about diversity,” says MacHale. “We didn't play to stereotypes.” The series was nominated for an NAACP Image Award in 1996. The show has also been seen as helping to create a generation of feminist horror fans, as it showed kids a world “where girls got to be the imperfect heroes as often as the boys did.” According to MacHale, “in the first season alone, half of the scripts focused on female characters and were written by female writers.”

Home media

VHS releases
Three VHS tapes were released by Sony Wonder. Ghostly Tales, which included the episodes "The Tale of the Shiny Red Bicycle" and "The Tale of the Frozen Ghost" plus a bonus "Feel the Fear" music video, was released on March 22, 1994; Nightmare Tales, which included the episodes "The Tale of the Final Wish" and "The Tale of the Dream Machine", was released on May 31, 1994; and The Tale of Cutter's Treasure was released on June 13, 1995.

In addition, episodes of the series were included on two compilation tapes of SNICK programming, both of which were released on August 31, 1993; "The Tale of the Lonely Ghost" was included on Nick Snicks Friendship, and "The Tale of the Hungry Hounds" was included on Nick Snicks the Family.

DVD releases
Direct Source released all seven seasons of Are You Afraid of the Dark? on DVD in Region 1 for the very first time between 2006 and 2008. The first five seasons were released in Canada and the United States, while seasons 1 and 2 of the revival series were released in Canada only. The company also released a joint collection of seasons 1–2/seasons 3–4 as a box set. These releases have been discontinued and are now out-of-print.

On April 8, 2013, it was announced that Berkshire Axis Media had acquired the rights to the series (Canada only) and would be re-releasing it. Season 1 was re-released on May 28, 2013. Season 2 was re-released on October 15, 2013.

In Region 2, Revelation Films released the first four seasons on DVD in the UK in 2007/2008.

Nickelodeon also re-released the series on DVD in the US through Amazon.com's CreateSpace service beginning with two random-episode "volumes" released in 2013. However, those releases were canceled and were followed by proper season set releases beginning in 2014.

On December 1, 2014, it was announced that Madman Films had acquired the rights to the series in Australia, and would be releasing the series through Via Vision Entertainment. In 2015 Via Vision released seasons 1–3 individually. It was announced on September 22, 2017, that Via Vision Entertainment have no plans to release the remaining seasons of Are You Afraid of the Dark?

{| class="wikitable"
|-
! Release name
! Ep #
! Region 1 (US)
! Region 1 (Canada)
! Region 2 (UK)
! Region 4 (Australia)
|- style="text-align:center;"
| Freaky Favorites
| align="center"|6
| December 8, 1999
| N/A
| N/A
| N/A
|- style="text-align:center;"
| The Complete 1st Season
| align="center"|13
| June 23, 2014
| April 18, 2006  May 28, 2013 (re-release)
| N/A
| February 4, 2015
|- style="text-align:center;"
| The Complete 2nd Season
| align="center"|13
| June 26, 2014
| November 28, 2006October 15, 2013 (re-release)
| N/A
| March 11, 2015
|- style="text-align:center;"
| The Complete 3rd Season
| align="center"|13
| September 24, 2014
| April 24, 2007
| N/A
| April 10, 2015
|- style="text-align:center;"
| The Complete 4th Season
| align="center"|13
| October 2, 2014
| November 13, 2007
| N/A
| N/A
|- style="text-align:center;"
| The Complete 5th Season
| align="center"|13
| October 15, 2014
| February 26, 2008
| N/A
| N/A
|-
|- style="text-align:center;"
| The Complete 6th Season
| align="center"|13
| N/A
|April 29, 2008
| April 29, 2008<ref>Lambert, David "[http://tvshowsondvd.com/news/Afraid-Dark-Season-6/9120 Are You Afraid of The Dark? – Date, Box Art, Contents & Extras for USA and Canada DVDs for Season 6"] , TVShowsOnDVD.com, March 5, 2008.</ref>
| N/A
|- style="text-align:center;"
| The Complete 7th Season| align="center"|13
| N/A
|August 19, 2008
| August 19, 2008
| N/A
|- style="text-align:center;"
| The Limited Series Event| align="center"|6
| August 11, 2020
| N/A
| N/A
| N/A
|- style="text-align:center;"
| Curse of the Shadows| align="center"|6
| August 10, 2021
| N/A
| N/A
| N/A
|- style="text-align:center;"
| The Complete Series 1 & 2| align="center"|26
| N/A
| N/A
| March 5, 2007
| N/A
|- style="text-align:center;"
| The Complete Series 3 & 4| align="center"|26
| N/A
| N/A
| April 7, 2008
| N/A
|}

Online distribution

The first five complete seasons of the series have been released (non-sequentially) across ten volumes in digital format on iTunes, Amazon, and Vudu:

In September 2016, all seven seasons of the first two series were made available for free on YouTube for non-United States viewers. On November 6, 2017, Season one was released for free on Canada Media Fund's Encore+ YouTube channel. As of 2021, Are You Afraid of the Dark? is available on Paramount+. However, there are some missing episodes: "Tale of the Super Specs", "Tale of the Dark Dragon", "Tale of the Midnight Ride", "Tale of the Dream Girl", "Tale of Quicksilver", "Tale of the Long Ago Locket", "Tale of the Fire Ghost", "Tale of the Closet Keepers", "Tale of the Unfinished Painting", "Tale of the Chameleons", "Tale of C7", and the revival seasons six and seven.

Second revival
On February 14, 2019, it was announced that the series itself would be revived for a miniseries to air in October 2019. On June 10, 2019, the cast for the miniseries was announced with Sam Ashe Arnold as Gavin, Miya Cech as Akiko, Tamara Smart as Louise, Jeremy Ray Taylor as Graham and Lyliana Wray as Rachel as the New Midnight Society and Rafael Casal as The Carnival of Doom's ringmaster, Mr. Tophat. The miniseries aired on Friday, October 11, 18, and 25, 2019 and was a ratings success. Brandon Routh guest starred in part two.

On February 19, 2020, it was renewed for a second season, titled Are You Afraid of the Dark?: Curse of the Shadows. On October 29, 2020, the casting for a second season was announced with Bryce Gheisar, Arjun Athalye, Beatrice Kitsos, Malia Baker, Dominic Mariche and Parker Queenan as the new Midnight Society. The second season premiered on February 12, 2021.

On March 24, 2022, the series was renewed for a third season, subtitled Ghost Island. Telci Huynh, Conor Sherry, Luca Padovan, Dior Goodjohn and Chance Hurstfield joined the cast as new members of the Midnight Society, while Julian Curtis joined the cast as a hotel manager. The third season premiered on July 30, 2022.

Other media
A music video with the horror-themed dance song “Feel the Fear” was aired on Nickelodeon and included as a bonus feature on VHS tapes. The television series also spawned multiple licensed products. A PC game based on the show titled Are You Afraid of the Dark? The Tale of Orpheo's Curse was released in 1994. A board game titled Are You Afraid of the Dark?: The Game was also released. They also released a series of audio cassettes entitled Are You Afraid of the Dark?: More Tales From The Midnight Society which were narrated and voiced by actors from the show who reprised their respective characters. Perhaps the most prominent of products from the franchise's merchandising was a series of books written by various authors between 1995 and 1998.

On November 13, 2017, it was announced that a film adaptation of the series was in the works at Paramount Players. It'' writer Gary Dauberman was set to write the screenplay with Matt Kaplan producing and D.J. Caruso directing. The film was scheduled to be released on October 4, 2019. However, on February 27, 2019, Paramount removed the film from their schedule.

Notes

References

Sources

External links
 
  (original series)
  (first revival series)
  (second revival series)

1990s Nickelodeon original programming
1990s American anthology television series
1990s American children's television series
1990s Canadian anthology television series
1990s Canadian children's television series
1990 American television series debuts
1996 American television series endings
1999 American television series debuts
1990 Canadian television series debuts
1996 Canadian television series endings
1999 Canadian television series debuts
2000s Nickelodeon original programming
2000s American anthology television series
2000s American children's television series
2000s Canadian anthology television series
2000s Canadian children's television series
2000 American television series endings
2000 Canadian television series endings
2010s Nickelodeon original programming
2010s American anthology television series
2010s American children's television series
2010s Canadian anthology television series
2010s Canadian children's television series
2019 American television series debuts
2019 Canadian television series debuts
2020s Nickelodeon original programming
2020s American anthology television series
2020s American children's television series
2020s Canadian children's television series
American children's horror television series
American horror fiction television series
American television series revived after cancellation
Canadian children's horror television series
Canadian horror fiction television series
Canadian television series revived after cancellation
Are You Afraid of the Dark?
English-language television shows
Family Channel (Canadian TV network) original programming
Nickelodeon original programming
Sandman in television
Television series by Cookie Jar Entertainment
Television series about teenagers
Television shows filmed in British Columbia
Television shows filmed in Montreal
Television shows filmed in the Dominican Republic